Anthony "Paul Reno (born February 9, 1974) is an American college football coach. He is the head football coach at Yale University, a position he has held since 2012.

Early life and education
A native of Oxford, Massachusetts, Reno graduated from Oxford High School in 1993. Later that year, he enrolled at Hobart and William Smith Colleges in Geneva, New York, but soon transferred to Worcester State College in his home state of Massachusetts. Reno played football at the free safety position for the Worcester State Lancers until 1996, under Brien Cullen. Reno graduated a year later in 1997. He would return to the school and complete a Master of Education in health education in 2000.

Coaching career

Upon graduating from Worcester State, Reno began his coaching career as a defensive assistant, under Richard Mannello, for the King's College Monarchs in Pennsylvania. During that 1997 season, The Monarchs finished fourth in the MAC Freedom Conference with a losing 3-7 record.

A year later, in 1998, Reno returned to the Worcester State Lancers as a defensive coordinator under his former coach, Cullen. Reno remained there until 2002. While his first two years at Worcester State saw losing records, the last three were very successful, and resulted in winning the Eastern College Athletic Conference Northeast Bowl in 2001.

Reno's success with the Lancers opened the opportunity as a wide receivers coach, under Jack Siedlecki, for the Yale Bulldogs in 2003. Reno was shuffled to be the defensive backs coach a year later, a post which he held until 2008. The Bulldogs mostly hovered around a .500 win percentage during his time at Yale; however, the 2006 season resulted in the team being named co-Ivy League champions, along with the Princeton Tigers.

In 2009, Reno transferred within the Ivy League to work for the Harvard Crimson as a special teams and defensive backs coach under Tim Murphy. The Crimson maintained a winning record throughout Reno's time there, and won the Ivy League in his final season in 2011.

On January 12, 2012, Reno was hired as the Joel E. Smilow '54 Head Coach of Football for the Yale Bulldogs. He replaced Tom Williams and became the 34th head coach in the school's history. Notably, Reno also became the first native of Massachusetts since Ted Coy in 1910 to coach the Bulldogs. So far, the team has won three Ivy League championships under the leadership of Reno (2017, 2019 and 2022).

In 2014, Reno was among the finalists for the Eddie Robinson Award, along with his former colleague, Murphy. The award ultimately went to Sean McDonnell of the New Hampshire Wildcats.

Personal life
Reno is married to his wife, Toni, with whom he has two sons, Dante and Vince, and one daughter, Angelina. The family resides in Sturbridge, Massachusetts, as well as near New Haven, Connecticut.

Head coaching record

References

External links
 Yale profile

1974 births
Living people
American football safeties
Harvard Crimson football coaches
King's College Monarchs football coaches
Worcester State Lancers football coaches
Worcester State Lancers football players
Yale Bulldogs football coaches
People from Oxford, Massachusetts
Sportspeople from Worcester County, Massachusetts
Coaches of American football from Massachusetts
Players of American football from Massachusetts